Ravinder Pal Singh (6 September 1960 – 8 May 2021) was an Indian field hockey player and former banker. He was well known as a prominent centre-half during his playing days from 1979 to 1984. He was part of the Indian hockey team that won the gold medal in 1980 Summer Olympics at Moscow where India defeated Spain 4-3 in the final.

Biography 
He was born on 6 September 1960 Sitapur, Uttar Pradesh. He was regarded as a person having the characteristics of an introvert according to his former teammates. He remained as a single throughout his lifetime and was survived by his niece Pragya Yadav. He graduated from the Lucknow Sports Hostel.

Career 
He was well known for his aggressive display in the field during his playing days and was referred to as a complete player by his team mates. He was also lauded for his quite, calm composed attitude in the play field and also for his ball distribution.

Ravinder Pal Singh was part of the Indian team which competed at the 1979 Junior Hockey World Cup. He made his maiden Olympics appearance at the age of 20 representing India during the 1980 Summer Olympics and played a key role in India's triumph in the hockey tournament claiming gold medal. He also eventually represented India at the 1984 Summer Olympics which was held at Los Angeles and was part of Indian hockey team which finished at 5th position.

He also went onto feature at Hockey Champions Trophy on two occasions in 1980 and 1983 and also featured in Indian team at the 1983 Silver Jubilee 10 Nation Cup in Hong Kong. He also made his maiden appearance in Hockey World Cup tournament during the 1982 Men's Hockey World Cup in Mumbai where India finished at 5th position and he was also part of Indian side which competed at the 1982 Men's Hockey Asia Cup in Karachi where India emerged as runners-up to hosts and arch-rivals Pakistan in the final.

He pursued his later career as a banker at the State Bank of India after retiring from international arena. He retired from playing field hockey because of prolonged chronic spinal injury. He represented State Bank of India hockey side in the Murugappa All India Invitation Hockey Tournament during the 1980s and 1990s post international retirement. Ravinder Pal took voluntary retirement after serving at the State Bank of India for brief period of time. He also played football during the leisure time at the KD Singh Stadium.

Death 
He died on 8 May 2021 at the age of 60 in Lucknow due to COVID-19. He was admitted at the Vivekananda Hospital on 24 April 2021 after being tested positive for COVID-19. He had initially recovered from COVID-19 and was shifted to the non-COVID ICU ward on 6 May 2021 after being tested negative for the virus. However, his condition suddenly deteriorated unexpectedly on the very next day on 7 May 2021 and was put on a ventilator.

References

External links
 

1960 births
2021 deaths
Field hockey players from Uttar Pradesh
Olympic field hockey players of India
Olympic gold medalists for India
Field hockey players at the 1980 Summer Olympics
Field hockey players at the 1984 Summer Olympics
Olympic medalists in field hockey
Sportspeople from Lucknow
Indian male field hockey players
Medalists at the 1980 Summer Olympics
Deaths from the COVID-19 pandemic in India